Indonesia women's national football team results may refer to:

 Indonesia women's national football team results (1975–1999)
 Indonesia women's national football team results (2000–2009)
 Indonesia women's national football team results (2010–2019)
 2013 Indonesia national football team results
 2015 Indonesia national football team results
 Indonesia women's national football team results (2020–present)
 2021 Indonesia national football team results
 2022 Indonesia national football team results

Indonesia women's national football team results